P1-185, also known as progesterone 3-O-(L-valine)-E-oxime or as pregn-4-ene-3,20-dione 3-O-(L-valine)-E-oxime, is a synthetic progestogen and neurosteroid and an oxime ester analogue and prodrug of progesterone (and by extension of allopregnanolone). It was developed as an improved water-soluble version of progesterone such that it could be formulated as an aqueous preparation and easily and rapidly administered intravenously as a potential therapy for traumatic brain injury. However, the chemical synthesis of P1-185 was described as somewhat challenging, so oxime conjugates of progesterone of the C20 instead of C3 position, such as EIDD-1723 and EIDD-036, have since been developed.

See also
 List of neurosteroids § Inhibitory > Synthetic > Pregnanes
 List of progestogen esters § Oximes of progesterone derivatives

References

External links

GABAA receptor positive allosteric modulators
Ketones
Neuroprotective agents
Neurosteroids
Pregnanes
Prodrugs
Progestogens
Steroid oximes
Oxime esters